Joseph C. Pollet (1897–1979)  was an American painter, based in New York City and the region. He was best known for his portraits and realistic rural landscapes.

Biography
Pollet was born in 1897 in Albbruck, Germany and immigrated in 1911 as a youth with his parents to New York City. He studied at the Art Students League of New York under artist John Sloan.  

By age 21 Pollet was employed as an advertising copywriter, while studying painting. He settled near Woodstock, New York.  He received early notice for his portraits and landscapes. In the 1940s, he was described as pursuing a variety of techniques and evading characterization of style. 

He retained ties in Woodstock during the several years, from 1954 until 1961, when he lived in Paris and Italy. After Pollet returned to the United States and New York, he lived in Greenwich Village in Manhattan.

Pollet was best known for his realistic rural landscapes.  In 1971, a fire in his Greenwich Village studio destroyed nearly 150 of his paintings.

Marriage and family 
Pollet married. He and his wife had three children together: two daughters and a son.

References

Joseph Pollet, online biography,  James Cox Gallery

1897 births
1979 deaths
Art Students League of New York alumni
American people of German descent